Vikersund Station is a railway station located at the village of Vikersund in Modum, Norway. At Vikersund there is a junction with the Randsfjorden Line (Randsfjordbane) on which Vy Tog operates some express trains between Bergen and Oslo.

History

The station was opened in 1866, as part of the Randsfjorden Line. In 1872, Vikersund became the terminus of the Krøderen Line (Krøderbanen), a  branch line to the lake of Krøderen.  Passenger services on the Krøderen Line were withdrawn in 1958  and freight traffic in 1985. The rail line was transformed into a heritage railway with outings between Vikersund Station and Krøderen, a distance of about 26 km. The rail lane is operated  by the Norwegian Railway Club and the Krøderbanen Foundation.

References

External links
 Jernbaneverket page on Vikersund  
Krøderbanen website

Railway stations in Buskerud
Railway stations on the Randsfjorden Line
Railway stations opened in 1866
1866 establishments in Norway